The Barlow Rocks are a group of rocks standing below the northwest slopes of Mount Morning on the south margin of upper Koettlitz Glacier in Victoria Land. They were named by the Advisory Committee on Antarctic Names in 1994 after Roger A. Barlow, United States Geological Survey cartographer, a member of the satellite surveying team at South Pole Station, winter party 1992.

References
 

Rock formations of the Ross Dependency
Scott Coast